The German Police Trade Union (DPolG) is a trade union in Germany. Representing 94,000 police employees, it is the second largest union for police employees in Germany, following the Gewerkschaft der Polizei (GdP). It is affiliated with the German Civil Service Federation (DBB).

Since 2007, the union has been headed by Rainer Wendt, who was reelected in 2011, and – receiving more than 98% of member votes – in 2015.

Presidents

 1951–1962: Kurt Fähnrich
 1962–1968: Walter Seidel
 1968–1971: Jürgen Brockmann
 1971–1975: Johannes Zistel
 1975–1991: Benedikt-Martin Gregg
 1991–1995: Harald Thiemann
 1995–2003: Gerhard Vogler
 2003–2007: Wolfgang Speck
 since 2007: Rainer Wendt

References

External links

 

Trade unions in Germany
Organisations based in Berlin
Trade unions established in 1951
1951 establishments in Germany